Bac Mòr is a Scottish island, one of the Treshnish Isles, sometimes referred to as The Dutchman's Cap in English because of its shape.

Origin of name
The Gaelic name has more than one possible interpretation. Although Mòr clearly means "large" (as opposed to Bac Beag, its smaller sister), the word Bac can mean either a "bank", or an "obstacle" or "hindrance". 

The island's profile is one of the more distinctive amongst the Scottish Islands.

Geology

Bac Mòr is of ancient volcanic origin, and the peak in the middle is a former cone. The low-lying plain surrounding it is a glassy lava field.

The remains of summer sheilings have been found on the island, suggesting that it was inhabited at one time, even though it has no safe landing places.

Wildlife
The Treshnish Isles, which are uninhabited today, are owned by a charity, the Hebridean Trust. They have been collectively designated as a Site of Special Scientific Interest and a Special Protection Area, due to their importance for breeding seabirds. The islands are also home to a number of wildflowers.

References

Treshnish Isles
Special Protection Areas in Scotland
Sites of Special Scientific Interest in Mull, Coll and Tiree
Special Areas of Conservation in Scotland
Uninhabited islands of Argyll and Bute